Bicep are an electronic music production and DJ duo from Belfast, Northern Ireland, consisting of Andrew Ferguson and Matthew McBriar.

History
Bicep was formed in 2009 as a production and DJing pair in London. The duo, childhood friends, created a blog called "Feel My Bicep", which was used to post lost and forgotten disco, Chicago house, Detroit techno and Italo disco edits.

They released tracks on labels Throne of Blood, Traveller Records and Mystery Meat before joining Will Saul's Aus Music and setting up their own label Feel My Bicep in September 2012. That year the pair were awarded DJ Mag'''s 'Best of British Breakthrough DJ' award.

After signing to Ninja Tune in 2017, Bicep released their debut album Bicep, which went in at number 20 on the UK Albums Chart, and received support from publications such as Pitchfork, The Guardian, Resident Advisor and Mixmag. The lead single, "Glue", was voted by the public as DJ Mag's (Best of British) Track of the Year. It also reached number 1 on Amazon's Best Electronic of 2017, and came second in Mixmag's 100 Best Tracks of 2017.

Bicep released their second album Isles on Ninja Tune on 22 January 2021. They released the lead single "Apricots" with a music video from BAFTA-winner director Mark Jenkin. "Apricots" scored Top-50 entries in both the UK's Official Singles Chart and Billboard's Dance/Electronic Songs Chart, was named Billboard's #1 dance track of 2020, hit #1 on the UK's Shazam chart, and spent 10 weeks on the BBC Radio 1 playlist.

The album was nominated for Best Irish Album of 2021 for the Choice Music Prize.Isles was number one on the midweek UK Albums Chart for the week beginning 25 January 2021, before debuting at number two on the final chart, scooping a number 1 on the UK Official Vinyl Albums Chart, additionally breaking into multiple Billboard charts including number 12 on the Dance/Electronic Chart.

The duo made a pivot to ticketed streams during the coronavirus pandemic, delivering two shows broadcast across 5 timezones. The shows were watched in over 70 countries worldwide, giving fans new live material ahead of the return of in-person shows. The second global stream was recorded at London's Saatchi Gallery and was awarded four stars by The Guardian, with NME calling it an innovative and boundary-pushing audiovisual show. 

Following the release of Isles, Bicep were nominated in two categories at the 2021 BRIT Awards for 'British Group' and 'Breakthrough Artist'.

Live performances
Between 2017 and 2018, the duo embarked on a live headline world tour to venues across the world, including the US, Japan and Europe. In the UK, they played shows at Electric Brixton, Roundhouse and three consecutive dates alongside Overmono at Printworks in London, which was filmed by Resident Advisor'' and one of their final live shows until 2020.

Bicep headlined their first major British festival at Field Day in August 2021.

Discography

Studio albums

Extended plays

Singles

Other charted songs

Awards and nominations

References

External links

http://thisismusicltd.com/artist/bicep/ 

Musical duos from Northern Ireland
Electronic music groups from Northern Ireland
Electronic music duos
Musical groups from Belfast
DJs from Belfast
Ninja_Tune_artists